Walls is a studio album by Apparat. It was released on Shitkatapult in 2007.

Critical reception

Ned Raggett of AllMusic gave the album 4 stars out of 5, commenting that it is "a remarkable album that ranks as his best yet." Nitsuh Abebe of Pitchfork, who gave the album an 8.1 out of 10, compared the album to the work of M83 and Slowdive, calling it "one of the best electronic dream-pop records in a while". He added, "The best of these tracks combine the mechanized pulse and sonic possibilities of techno with good old bliss-out dreams better than anything in a while."

Track listing

Personnel
Credits adapted from liner notes.

 Sascha Ring – vocals (8, 9), production
 Kathrin Pfänder – strings
 Lisa Stepf – strings
 Raz Ohara – vocals (2, 5, 11, 12)
 Simon Berz – drums (9)
 Jörg Wähner – drums (11, 12)
 Joshua Eustis – mixing
 Roger Seibel – mastering
 Maria Hinze – painting
 Ivan Negro – Apparat logo

Charts

References

External links
 

2007 albums
Apparat (musician) albums